Sepoy was the Persian-derived term from the world "sipahi" or a professional  Indian infantryman, traditionally armed with a musket, in the  armies of the Mughal Empire.

In the 18th century, the French East India Company and its other European counterparts employed locally recruited soldiers within India, mainly consisting of infantry designated as "sepoys". The largest sepoy force, trained along European lines, served the British East India Company

The term "sipahi" or sometimes "sepoy" continues in use in the modern  Indian,  Pakistan and  Nepalese armies, where it denotes the rank of  private.

Etymology

In Persian  (Aspa) means horse and Ispahai is also the word for cavalrymen.

The term sepoy is derived from the Persian word  meaning the traditional "infantry soldier" in the Mughal Empire.

In the Ottoman Empire the term  was used to refer to cavalrymen.

History

The sepoys of the Mughal Empire were infantrymen usually armed with a musket and a talwar, although they sometimes operated artillery pieces and even rockets. They wore the colours of the "Great Moghul" and sometimes used war elephants for transport.

The French East India Company was the first to employ locally recruited sepoys during the Carnatic Wars. Soon other European powers did the same, to protect their interests.

In its most common application, sepoy was the term used in the British Indian Army and, earlier, in the army of the British East India Company, for an infantry private.

Historical usage
The term sepoy came into common use in the forces of the British East India Company in the eighteenth century, where it was one of a number of names, such as peons, gentoos, mestees and topasses, used for various categories of native soldier. Initially it referred to Hindu or Muslim soldiers without regular uniforms or discipline. It later generically referred to all native soldiers in the service of the European powers in India. Close to ninety-six percent of the British East India Company's army of 300,000 men were native to India and these sepoys played a crucial role in securing the subcontinent for the company.

Equipment

The earliest sepoys used matchlock muskets and operated bulky and inefficient cannons to a limited extent during the reigns of Babur Akbar when archery and fighting from horseback was more common. By the time of Aurangzeb the Mughal armies had advanced significantly and utilized a wider range of weapons to win battles.
 
During the Carnatic Wars and Anglo-Mysore Wars the sepoys of the Mughal Empire employed more advanced types of musket, as well as blunderbuss and rocket weapons.

History

Mughal Empire 16th–18th centuries

A Sipahi or a sepoy was an infantryman armed with a musket in the army of the Mughal Empire.

The earliest sepoys were armed with daggers, talwars and matchlocks. By the mid to late 17th century they began to utilize more upgraded forms of muskets and even rockets. These sepoys also operated and mounted artillery pieces and sharpshooter upon war elephants which were also used for transport, hauling artillery and in combat.

By the 18th century individual Nawabs employed their own sepoy units as did the European merchant companies established in parts of India.

Sepoys became more visible when they gained European arms and fought for various fragmented polities of the Mughal Empire during the Carnatic Wars and the Bengal War. After which the importance of the local sepoy diminished and were replaced by the "European hired Sepoy".

Sepoys in British service

The East India Company initially recruited sepoys from the local communities in the Madras and Bombay Presidencies. The emphasis here favored tall and soldierly recruits, broadly defined as being "of a proper caste and of sufficient size". In the Bengal Army however, recruitment was only amongst high caste Brahmin and Rajput communities, mainly from the present day Uttar Pradesh and Bihar regions. Recruitment was undertaken locally by battalions or regiments often from the same community, village and even family. The commanding officer of a battalion became a form of substitute for the village chief or gaon bura. He was the mai-baap or the "father and mother" of the sepoys making up the paltan (from "platoon"). There were many family and community ties amongst the troops and numerous instances where family members enlisted in the same battalion or regiment. The izzat ("honour") of the unit was represented by the regimental colours; the new sepoy having to swear an oath in front of them on enlistment. These colours were stored in honour in the quarter guard and frequently paraded before the men. They formed a rallying point in battle. The oath of fealty by the sepoy was given to the East India Company and included a pledge of faithfulness to the salt that one has eaten.

The salary of the sepoys employed by the East India Company, while not substantially greater than that paid by the rulers of Indian states, was usually paid regularly. Advances could be given and family allotments from pay due were permitted when the troops served abroad. There was a commissariat and regular rations were provided. Weapons, clothing and ammunition were provided centrally, in contrast to the soldiers of local kings whose pay was often in arrears. In addition local rulers usually expected their sepoys to arm themselves and to sustain themselves through plunder.

This combination of factors led to the development of a sense of shared honour and ethos amongst the well drilled and disciplined Indian soldiery who formed the key to the success of European feats of arms in India and abroad.

Following the Indian Rebellion of 1857 the surviving East India Company regiments were merged into a new Indian Army under the direct control of the British Crown. The designation of "sepoy" was retained for Indian soldiers below the rank of lance naik, except in cavalry where the equivalent ranks were sowar or "trooper".

Sepoys in French service
Following the formation of the French East India Company in 1719, companies of Indian sepoys were raised to augment the French regulars and Swiss mercenary troops available. By 1720 the sepoys in French service numbered about 10,000. Although much reduced in numbers after their decisive defeat in India at the Battle of Wandewash in 1760, France continued to maintain a Military Corps of Indian Sepoys in Pondicherry until it was disbanded and replaced by a locally recruited gendarmerie in 1898.
The 19th century diplomat Sir Justin Sheil commented about the British East India Company copying the French Indian army in raising an army of Indians:

Sepoys in Portuguese service
Sepoys were also recruited in Portuguese India.  The term  (sepoy) was also applied by the Portuguese to African soldiers in Angola, Mozambique and Portuguese Guinea, plus African rural police officers.  from Angola provided part of the garrison of Goa during the final years of Portuguese rule of that Indian territory.

Contemporary sepoys
The title of "sepoy" is still retained in the modern Nepalese Army, Indian Army and Pakistan Army. In each of these it designates the rank of private.

Other usages
, the Basque version of the word, is used by leftist Basque nationalists as an insult for members of the Basque Police, implying that they are not a national police of the Basque region due to their connection with the Spanish government.

In Hispanic American countries, especially in Argentina, the word  has historically been used as a pejorative colloquial expression referring to individuals considered as serving foreign interests, as opposed to serving their own country.

See also
 Indian Rebellion of 1857 (termed by some The Sepoy Mutiny)
 Maharajah and the Sepoys
 Jawan, a contemporary soldier of the armies of India and Pakistan.
 Sowar, meaning "the one who rides" in Persian, was originally a rank during the Mughal period.
 Lascar, Indian sailors in European service
 Askari, African troops in service to colonial powers similar to the Sepoys.
 Sepah, the Islamic Revolutionary Guard Corps of Iran

References

Military of the Mughal Empire
Colonial troops
Military ranks of British India
Military ranks of the Indian Army
Pakistan Army ranks
Infantry